Keith Thomas (born January 18, 1956) is a sailor who competed for the British Virgin Islands. Thomas competed at the 1984 Summer Olympics in Los Angeles, he was part of the three man team that entered the Soling class and out of 22 crews they finished 21st.

References

Olympic sailors of the British Virgin Islands
British Virgin Islands male sailors (sport)
Sailors at the 1984 Summer Olympics – Soling
Living people
1956 births